Dimosthenis Theocharidis (10 July 1914  –  20 February 2019) was a Greek lawyer and politician. He served as MP for Florina with various parties for many terms. He was elected for a total of eight terms, matching Georgios Andreadis's record. Prior to his death he was the oldest living politician in New Democracy.

Career 
He was born on 10 July 1914 in Agrapadies, Florina, the son of Michail and Soultana. He studied and practiced law.

He was elected MP for Florina with EPEK in 1951 and 1952, and for Florina-Kastoria with EPEK (part of the Liberal Democratic Union coalition) in 1956.  He was reelected for Florina with Centre Union in 1961, 1963 and 1964. During the 1967-1974 dictatorship he was arrested and imprisoned in the prison of Marousi.

In 1974, after the fall of the dictatorship, he was a candidate MP for Florina with Centre Union – New Forces, getting 4,464 votes. In 1977 he again ran unsuccessfully in Florina with the Union of the Democratic Centre.

He was reelected with New Democracy in 1981 with 7,007 votes and again in 1985.

He was also, as personally chosen by Karamanlis, General Secretary of Northern Greece. His funeral service was conducted in the Metropolitan Church of Saint Panteleimon of Florina.

References

Bibliography 
Kostas Dingaves, The elections in Greece 1844-1985, Μαλλιάρης-Παιδεία, Thessaloniki 1986.

People from Florina (regional unit)
1914 births
2019 deaths
Greek centenarians
Men centenarians
Greek MPs 1951–1952
Greek MPs 1952–1956
Greek MPs 1956–1958
Greek MPs 1961–1963
Greek MPs 1963–1964
Greek MPs 1964–1967
Greek MPs 1981–1985
Greek MPs 1985–1989